Pedro Nájera Pacheco (3 February 1929 – 22 August 2020) was a Mexican football midfielder.

Life and career
He played for Mexico national team in two FIFA World Cup tournaments (1954 and 1962). He also played for Club América.

References

External links
FIFA profile

Mexican footballers
Mexico international footballers
Association football midfielders
Club América footballers
1954 FIFA World Cup players
1962 FIFA World Cup players
Liga MX players
1929 births
2020 deaths